is a 1986 arcade game by Sega, and the first game in the Fantasy Zone series. It was later ported to a wide variety of consoles, including the Master System. The player controls a sentient spaceship named Opa-Opa who fights an enemy invasion in the titular group of planets. The game contains a number of features atypical of the traditional scrolling shooter. The main character, Opa-Opa, is sometimes referred to as Sega's first mascot character.

The game design and main character have many similarities to the earlier TwinBee, and both are credited with establishing the cute 'em up subgenre. It also popularized the concept of a boss rush, a stage where the player faces multiple previous bosses again in succession. Numerous sequels were made over the years.

Gameplay

In the game, the player's ship is placed in a level with a number of bases to destroy. When all the bases are gone, the stage boss appears, who must be defeated in order to move on to the next stage. There are eight stages, and in all of them, except the final one, the scroll is not fixed; the player can move either left or right, although the stage loops. The final level consists of a rematch against all of the previous bosses in succession before facing the final boss.

Opa-Opa uses two different attacks: the standard weapon (initially bullets) and bombs. He can also move down to land on the ground by sprouting feet and walking around until he flies again.

It is possible to upgrade Opa-Opa's weapons, get bombs and flying engine to increase speed, and get extra lives. To do these, the player must get money by defeating enemies, bases or bosses, and access a shop by touching a marked balloon. Prices rise with each purchase. When the player chooses to exit or the time runs up, another screen appears to equip these upgrades; only one engine, weapon and bomb can be equipped at a time.

Some of the new weapons have a time limit that starts as soon as the shop is left. Some of the bombs can be used at any moment, but are limited in quantity. Engine upgrades are permanent. The powerups can also be reassigned by reentering the shop or touch a balloon with the word "Select" written on it. If the player loses a life, all of the upgrades are lost.

Versions

Fantasy Zone was ported to the Sega Master System, MSX, Nintendo Entertainment System, Sharp X68000, and PC Engineall with similar gameplay. For example, the Master System version lacks some features such as the radar that indicates the location of the bases or a gauge that indicates energy level, and two of the bosses were replaced by original ones.

Two different versions were released for the Famicom and NES. The Japanese version was released in 1987, developed and published by Sunsoft. The American version was released in 1989, developed by Pixel and published unlicensed by Tengen. In 1997, Fantasy Zone was released in the Sega Ages series in Japan for the Sega Saturn.

Fantasy Zone was re-released as an enhanced remake for the PlayStation 2, again in the Sega Ages series. Although similar in appearance to the arcade version (even incorporating the original arcade sounds), this version uses polygons instead of sprites and adds some stages, including bonus levels with the viewpoint behind Opa-Opa as he tries to collect coins from any boss that was defeated at the moment; this game mode is very similar to Space Harrier, or the unreleased Space Fantasy Zone. This version was released in North America in the Sega Classics Collection.

Fantasy Zone was released for mobile phones in 2002 in Japan and in August 2003 in the United States. Due to hardware limitations, this version was divided in three different parts. The Master System version was re-released in Japan for the Virtual Console on March 11, 2008, for Europe and Australia on April 11, and in North America on April 14.

On September 18 , the final Sega Ages disc was devoted to the series, Fantasy Zone Complete Collection. Instead of a 3D remake, it compiles all of the games in the series, including spin-offs, all of Sega's own versions, and a remake of Fantasy Zone II for System 16 hardware.

The original arcade version is unlockable in Sonic's Ultimate Genesis Collection. A 3D port of the game was released on March 19, 2014 for the Nintendo 3DS titled 3D Fantasy Zone: Opa-Opa Bros. New features of the 3DS port involve stereoscopic 3D visuals, adjustable difficulty settings, the ability to save the game, the ability to switch to the Japanese versions and US versions of the game, a Stage Select feature, and a new mode which involves the player playing as Upa-Upa, Opa-Opa's brother. The two replacement bosses from the Master System release can be unveiled, each replacing the standard boss.

The arcade version is a minigame in several entries in the Yakuza series, beginning with Yakuza 0. It is identical to the original arcade release, except the addition of a rapid fire button.

On June 3, 2022, Sega announced that a brand new Sega Genesis port of the game has been developed for the Sega Genesis Mini 2, the successor to the Sega Genesis Mini microconsole, released on October 27, 2022. The port added a Super Easy mode.

Reception
Fantasy Zone was very successful in Japanese arcades, helping to give rise to the popular System 16 arcade board. In April 1986, it was the second top-grossing table arcade cabinet of the month in Japan. It was the top-grossing arcade game in Japan from July–August 1986.

The Sega Master System version was reviewed in 1988 in Dragon, given 4 out of 5 stars. In 1988, it got four categories of 9/10 each from Computer and Video Games, calling it "a beaut of a game [where] I-want-to-eat-this-cartridge scrolling backdrop and aliens float in from all sides spitting death at you". In 1989, Computer and Video Games rated the PC Engine version 88% and the Master System version 87%, considering the PC Engine version to be better than the Master System version but not as commercially successful. Console XS reviewed the Master System version in 1992, giving it a 91% score.

It was reviewed by Génération 4, Sega Power, Happy Computer, and Tilt in 1987
and 1990.

Sequels
 Fantasy Zone II: The Tears of Opa-Opa (1987)
 Opa Opa (released internationally as Fantasy Zone: The Maze) (1987)
 Galactic Protector (1988)
 Space Fantasy Zone (1990, unreleased)
 Fantasy Zone Gear: The Adventures of Opa-Opa Jr. (released internationally simply as Fantasy Zone) (1991)
 Super Fantasy Zone (1992)
 Fantasy Zone (Redemption Game) (1999)
 Medal de Fantasy Zone (2012)

Notes

References

External links
Fantasy Zone at Hardcore Gaming 101''

1986 video games
Sega arcade games
Shoot 'em ups
Cute 'em ups
Fantasy Zone (series)
Game Gear games
Mobile games
MSX games
Nintendo 3DS eShop games
Nintendo Entertainment System games
Horizontally scrolling shooters
Rutubo Games games
Sanritsu Denki games
Sega video games
Sega Games franchises
Master System games
Sega Genesis games
X68000 games
Tengen (company) games
TurboGrafx-16 games
Unauthorized video games
Video games scored by Hiroshi Kawaguchi
Video games set on fictional planets
Virtual Console games
Single-player video games
Sunsoft games
Sega Saturn games
Video games developed in Japan